The New Arab or Al-Araby Al-Jadeed is a pan-Arab news website headquartered in London. It was first launched in March 2014 as an online news website by Qatari company Fadaat Media. It went on to establish a daily newspaper in September 2014. In 2015, Fadaat launched Al Araby TV Network as a counterweight to Al Jazeera, which is viewed by the BBC to hold a pro-Muslim Brotherhood bias.

History
Dr. Azmi Bishara, a Doha-based ex-member of Israeli parliament, founded the Arabic-language news website as the first platform launched by Al-Araby Al-Jadeed in March 2014. Six months later, they launched an Arabic daily newspaper from London. An English version of the website was inaugurated shortly after the newspaper's launch, and goes by the translated name of The New Arab. Al-Araby Al-Jadeed now operates globally, with more than 150 staff in three offices, based in Beirut, Doha and London.

Ownership and finances
The outlet is owned by Qatar-based Fadaat Media Ltd. Abdulrahman Elshayyal is the newspaper's CEO. Fadaat Media is an Arab media investment company.

Coverage
Al-Araby Al-Jadeed stories are often taken up by Middle East-focused outlets as well as established outlets such as Time magazine, International Business Times, Middle East Eye, The National and others.

References

External links
The New Arab, homepage

2014 establishments in England
Mass media in London
Arab mass media
Mass media in Qatar